Tijmen van Loon (born 20 March 2001) is a Dutch track cyclist, who competes in sprinting events. 

Van Loon became the European Champion in the sprint event at the 2022 UEC European Under-23 Track Championships. He also competed at the 2022 UEC European Track Championships in the sprint event where he was eliminated in the quarter-finals.

Van Loon studies political science at the Radboud University Nijmegen.

Major results

2018
 1st  Sprint, National Junior Championships
2019
 2nd Team sprint, National Championships
 3rd  Team sprint, UEC European Junior Championships
2021
 National Championships
1st  Kilometer
1st  Team sprint
3rd Keirin
3rd Sprint
2022
 1st  Sprint, UEC European Under-23 Championships
 1st  Kilometer, National Championships
 UCI Nations Cup
1st Team sprint, Milton
3rd Team sprint, Glasgow
2023
 1st  Team sprint, UEC European Championships

References

External links

2001 births
Living people
Dutch male cyclists
Dutch track cyclists
Sportspeople from Amstelveen